Sohodol is a commune located in Alba County, Transylvania, Romania. It is composed of thirty-one villages: Băzești, Bilănești, Bobărești, Brădeana, Burzonești, Deoncești, Dilimani, Furduiești, Gura Sohodol, Hoancă, Joldișești, Lazuri, Lehești, Luminești, Medrești, Morărești, Munești, Năpăiești, Nelegești, Nicorești, Peleș (Peles), Poiana (Pojén), Robești, Sebișești, Sicoiești, Șimocești, Sohodol, Surdești, Țoci, Valea Verde and Vlădoșești.

References

Communes in Alba County
Localities in Transylvania